Ibn Hayyan may also refer to:

 Ibn Hayyan, historian from Al Andalus
 Jābir ibn Hayyān or Geber (c. 721–c. 815), Muslim chemist and alchemist, astronomer, astrologer, engineer, philosopher, pharmacist and physician
 Ibn Hayyan (company), one of the SABIC subsidiaries